"Head" is the ninth episode of the third season of the anthology television series American Horror Story, which premiered on December 11, 2013, on the cable network FX. The episode was written by Tim Minear and directed by Howard Deutch.

In this episode, Fiona (Jessica Lange) looks to form an alliance with Marie Laveau (Angela Bassett) while Cordelia (Sarah Paulson)'s attacker is revealed. Angela Bassett, Gabourey Sidibe, and Patti LuPone guest star as Marie Laveau, Queenie, and Joan Ramsey, respectively. This episode is rated TV-MA (LSV).

Plot

Fiona carries Delphine's head in a box into Cornrow City and asks Marie about an alliance. Fiona suggests they will eradicate the voodoo tribe after the witches are dead. Marie says she'll worry about that when the time comes and orders Queenie to burn Delphine's head.

Hank's back story is revealed, showing how his father trained him to be a witch hunter and how he met and charmed his way into Cordelia's life.

Myrtle prepares for a meeting with the Council of Witchcraft. Cecily raises her glass to toast Myrtle and becomes paralyzed, as does Quentin. Myrtle tells her guests that she gave them melon balls laced with monkshood. She uses the melon baller to scoop out Cecily's left eye, then Quentin's right eye. Cordelia wakes in her bed with her vision restored, but her gift of Second Sight gone.

In Luke's hospital room, Nan tells Joan that Luke says that God is judging his mother for killing his father. Joan maintains that the man died from anaphylaxis, but we see in flashback that Joan caused the anaphylaxis herself, putting bees into her husband's car and locking him in it.

After failing to make Delphine understand her black heritage, Queenie plays videos of civil rights era news footage, accompanied by spirituals. LaLaurie appears to be affected by the music and is driven to tears by the images of civil rights abuse. Downstairs, Queenie takes her place at the salon's front desk, as Hank storms in and begins shooting the voodoo tribe. Just as Hank is about to kill Marie, a wounded Queenie finds a handgun and shoots herself in the mouth, killing Hank and leaving her in an unknown state.

At the hospital, Luke wakes and accuses his mother of his father's murder. She tells him to go back to sleep, then smothers him with a pillow.

Reception
Rotten Tomatoes reports a 77% approval rating, based on 13 reviews. The critical consensus reads, ""Head" churns out terrific dialogue and a series of surprising plot twists, even as the sheer number of narrative arcs and political themes induce a certain amount of viewer fatigue." Emily VanDerWerff of The A.V. Club gave the episode a C− rating, saying, "There's a lot of "Head" that sort of feels like it works, particularly in the closing passages, where the episode almost manages that American Horror Story thing where a bunch of disparate elements the series has been building all season come together in a giant gumbo of wackadoo... But then I look at the episode and the season as a whole, and I'm just exhausted by it, and not in a good way." Matt Fowler from IGN gave the episode a 7.7/10 rating, stating, "The Hank storyline and his unexpected, violent turn on Laveau was very well done. The rest of "Head" felt undercooked though... I appreciate that the show takes risks with its mesh of tones, but there also comes a point where you just can't take away anything meaningful from a scene featuring a sassy head. Even if it's Kathy Bates."

"Head" received a 2.1 18–49 ratings share and was watched by 3.94 million viewers in its original American broadcast, a slight decrease from the previous episode.

References

External links

 
 "Head" at TV Guide.com

Fiction set in 1991
2013 American television episodes
American Horror Story: Coven episodes
Filicide in fiction
Mariticide in fiction
Television episodes written by Tim Minear